ASL19 (Persian: اصل ١٩) is an independent technology organisation that works toward practical responses for online access to information. Their work has been mired in allegations of sexual abuse and workplace harassment.

Based in Toronto, ASL19 was founded in 2012 with the support of the University of Toronto's Citizen Lab.

The University of Toronto has sought to distance themselves from the organisation since controversy about the organization was raised in 2017. In a November 2017 statement to Toronto's Metro News a university spokeswoman stated: "ASL19 has collaborated with Citizen Lab on research projects in the past and allowed its staff, including Karimzadeh Bangi, to make use of its facilities in 2012-14. Citizen Lab has not recently engaged in any such efforts with either ASL19 or Mr. Bangi. ASL19 is a completely separate and distinct organization."

Controversy

Allegations of sexual assault 

An investigative reportage by The Verge and an open letter from anonymous former female employees alleged workplace abuse and harassment existed within the organization. A freedom of information request from Ontario human rights tribunal demonstrated that an allegation of abuse and sexual assault had occurred within the workplace, while ASL19 managing staffs were allegedly complicit in covering up the alleged abuse. In the one reported case the organisation reportedly sought out a non-disclosure agreement.

Digital rights organisation Access Now terminated their partnership with ASL19 for their RightsCon summit series in December 2017. Access Now stated they will only reengage with ASL19 once they "feel confident that any reports of misconduct have been investigated and there has been an appropriate response." The organization has yet to change this policy.

References

External links
 Thinkprogress.org
 Citizenlab.org
 Iranmediaresearch.org

Internet-related activism
Internet governance advocacy groups
Organizations based in Toronto